The 19th Indian Infantry Brigade was an infantry brigade formation of the Indian Army during World War II. It was formed in October, 1940 at Old Delhi in India and assigned to the 8th Indian Infantry Division. In August 1941, they took part in the Anglo-Soviet invasion of Iran. In September 1943, they moved to the Italian Front, coming briefly under command of the 2nd New Zealand Division in November 1943 and the British 1st Infantry Division in December 1943. Apart from those two attachments the brigade remained with the 8th Indian Division for the remainder of the war.

Formation
3rd Battalion, 8th Punjab Regiment October 1940 to August 1945
1st Battalion, 1st Punjab Regiment December 1940 to November 1941
2nd Battalion, 6th Gurkha Rifles November 1940 to July 1942
1st Battalion, Essex Regiment December 1941 to May 1943
6th Battalion, 13th Frontier Force Rifles May to November 1942 and February 1943 to August 1945
5th Battalion, Essex Regiment May 1943 to March 1944
19th New Zealand Armoured Regiment November 1943
1st Battalion, Argyll and Sutherland Highlanders February 1944 to June 1945
1st Battalion, Jaipur Regiment September to October 1944

See also

 List of Indian Army Brigades in World War II

References

British Indian Army brigades